Sanchai Ratiwatana and Sonchat Ratiwatana were the defending champions but only Sonchat Ratiwatana defended his title, partnering Yi Chu-huan. Ratiwatana lost in the semifinals to Daniel Masur and Ante Pavić.

Masur and Pavić won the title after defeating Jeevan Nedunchezhiyan and Christopher Rungkat 4–6, 6–3, [10–6] in the final.

Seeds

Draw

References
 Main Draw

Kobe Challenger - Doubles
2016 Doubles